Košarkaški klub Rtanj, commonly referred to as KK Rtanj, is a men's basketball club based in Boljevac, Serbia. They are currently competing in the First Regional League of Serbia (3rd-tier). 

The club was founded in 1980 and was named after Rtanj, a mountain situated in eastern Serbia.

Players

Coaches

Trophies and awards

Trophies
 First Regional League (Eastern Division) (3rd-tier)
 Winners (2): 2015–16, 2017–18

Notable players 
  Boban Marjanović (youth system)

References

External links
 Profile at eurobasket.com
 Profile at srbijasport.net

Rtanj
Basketball teams established in 1980